The mixed-mating model is a mathematical model that describes the mating system of a plant population in terms of degree of self-fertilisation. It is a fairly simplistic model, employing several simplifying assumptions, most notably the assumption that every fertilisation event may be classed as either self-fertilisation, or outcrossing with a completely random mate. Thus the only model parameter to be estimated is the probability of self-fertilisation.

The mixed mating model originated in the 1910s, with plant breeders who were seeking evidence of outcrossing contamination of self-pollinating crops, but a formal description of the model and its parameter estimation was not published until 1951. The model is still in common use today, though a number of more complex models are also now in use. For example, a weakness of the model lies in its assumption that inbreeding occurs only as a result of self-fertilisation; in reality, inbreeding may also occur through outcrossing between closely related individuals. The effective selfing model relaxes this assumption by seeking also to estimate the degree of shared ancestry of outcrossing mates.

References

Plant sexuality
Mating systems
Mathematical modeling